Pogača is a type of bread baked in the ashes of the fireplace, and later on in the oven, similar to focaccia. Found in the cuisines of the Balkans, it can be leavened or unleavened, though the latter is considered more challenging to make. It is generally made from wheat flour, but barley and sometimes rye may be added. It can be stuffed with potatoes, ground beef, olive, or cheese, and have grains and herbs like sesame, black nigella seed, or dried dill in the dough or sprinkled on top.

Terminology

The word derives ultimately from the Latin panis focacius, i.e. bread (panis) baked on the hearth or fireplace (focus), via the Byzantine Greek πογάτσα (pogátsa), thence entering the South Slavic languages as pogača / погача.

A variant is known as pogačice (diminutive form), a type of puff pastry eaten in Bosnia and Herzegovina, Bulgaria, Croatia, Kosovo, Montenegro, North Macedonia, Serbia, Slovenia, and Turkey (where it is called poğaça) with variations like karaköy. It is called pogatschen in Austria, and pagáče in Slovakia. It is known by similar names in other languages: pogácsa (Hungarian), pogace (Romanian), ( 'bughátsa', Bulgarian, Macedonian and Serbian: , .

Slovenian pogača is a regional dish from White Carniola and Prlekija that is known locally under various names such as belokranjska pogača, ocvirkovca, gerpa, oprešak and postržjača. Rather than a stuffed savoury pastry, this dish is a type of traditional flatbread that is typically topped with ocvirki.

The pastry

Different localities make slightly different varieties of pogača, and thus there is a wide variety of textures and flavors.  Some may be just an inch in diameter; others are much larger. Others have a crumbly scone-like consistency inside, while others are more tender like a fresh dinner roll or croissant.

Many different ingredients can be used either in the dough, sprinkled on top before baking, or both:  medium-firm fresh cheeses, aged dry hard cheese(s), pork crackling (tepertő), cabbage, black pepper, hot or sweet paprika, garlic, red onion, caraway seeds, sesame seeds, sunflower seeds or poppy seeds.

In Turkish cuisine, poğaça can be filled with beyaz peynir (white cheese), or other fillings like black olives, potatoes, onions or ground beef.

See also

 List of pastries
 Boyoz
 Bougatsa
 Fatayer
 Kumru (sandwich)
 Nokul
 Pirozhki

References

External links

Turkish cuisine
Bosnia and Herzegovina cuisine
Bulgarian cuisine
Croatian cuisine
Serbian cuisine
Slovenian cuisine
Yeast breads
Unleavened breads
Flatbreads
Appetizers
Hungarian cuisine
Slovak cuisine
Stuffed dishes
Turkish tea culture
Albanian cuisine